Allen James Lynch (born October 28, 1945) is a former United States Army soldier and a recipient of the United States military's highest decoration, the Medal of Honor, for his actions in the Vietnam War.

Early life
Born on October 28, 1945, in Chicago, Lynch grew up in the Lake Eliza area of Porter County, Indiana, where he attended Union Center Elementary School and Wheeler Junior High School.

Military career
Lynch joined the United States Army from Chicago in 1964, and by December 15, 1967, was serving as a specialist four in Company D, 1st Battalion (Airmobile), 12th Cavalry Regiment, 1st Cavalry Division (Airmobile). During a firefight on that day, near My An, Binh Dinh Province, Republic of Vietnam, Lynch rescued three wounded soldiers and stayed behind to protect them when the rest of the company withdrew. He single-handedly defended the wounded men against enemy attack until locating a friendly force that could evacuate them. Lynch was subsequently promoted to sergeant and awarded the Medal of Honor for his actions. The medal was formally presented to him by President Richard Nixon in 1970.

Later life
After the war, Lynch settled in Gurnee, Illinois, and worked for the Department of Veterans Affairs, where he advocated increased benefits for disabled veterans. He later served as chief of the Illinois Attorney General's Veterans Rights Bureau until his retirement in 2005.

Lynch has volunteered for the Vietnam Veterans of America organization, is the liaison for the Congressional Medal of Honor Society, and frequently gives speeches at military-related events, such as Memorial Day ceremonies. Lynch's memoir, entitled Zero to Hero, was published in 2019.

Medal of Honor citation

See also

List of Medal of Honor recipients for the Vietnam War

References

External links
 Interview at the Pritzker Military Museum & Library on September 13, 2007
 Interview with Jack H. Jacobs on Medal of Honor: Portraits of Valor Beyond the Call of Duty at the Pritzker Military Museum & Library on November 19, 2011
 Interview at the Pritzker Military Museum & Library on April 14, 2004

1945 births
Living people
United States Army soldiers
United States Army personnel of the Vietnam War
United States Army Medal of Honor recipients
People from Chicago
People from Gurnee, Illinois
Vietnam War recipients of the Medal of Honor
Robert E. Lee High School (Jacksonville) alumni
American memoirists